Stink Studios (formerly Stinkdigital) is a global creative studio with offices in London, New York, Los Angeles, Paris, Shanghai, Berlin and Sao Paulo. The company is part of the Stink Group, an independently-owned global creative network. Stink Studios creates digital and integrated advertising working across film, design, technology and strategy. Its clients include Google, Spotify, Twitter, Ray-Ban and Nike.

History
Stinkdigital was founded in January 2009 as an interactive production company by Mark Pytlik, and Daniel Bergmann, Founder and Executive Producer of global film production company Stink. The company opened with a small office of five people. Its first project, done with Tribal DDB Amsterdam, was Carousel (advertisement), an interactive long form internet film for Philips to promote Philips Cinema 21:9 TV. Carousel went on to win the Film Grand Prix at Cannes Lions International Festival of Creativity that year.
	
In April 2010, the company opened their second office in New York City, USA.
	
In December 2012, the company opened their third office in Paris, France.
	
In June 2014, the company opened their fourth office in Berlin, Germany.
	
In January 2015, the company opened their fifth office in Los Angeles, USA.

In January 2017, Stinkdigital rebranded to Stink Studios.

Notable Work

2009 
 'Carousel (advertisement)', Philips Cinema 21:9 TV

2011 
 'Obsessed With Sound' for Philips

2012 
 'Tweetfuel'
 'The Sound of Creation' for Philips

2014 
 'The Other Side', a dual-narrative interactive film created for the launch of Honda's Civic Type R car, created with Wieden+Kennedy.
 'Monty's Goggles', an immersive 360° experience using Google Cardboard as part of John Lewis' 2014 Christmas campaign 'Monty The Penguin' with adam&eveDDB.

2015 
 'Inside Abbey Road', an online interactive experience that enables the public to access Abbey Road Studios created with Google and Abbey Road.

2017 
 'A Message From Earth', an interactive site of specially-commissioned music, film, art, and literature paying tribute to The Voyager Golden Record project to celebrate its 40th anniversary in partnership with WeTransfer.

2018 
 'The Most Exclusive Collection', an interactive campaign for Yoox

Clients
 Ray-Ban
 Strava
 Airbnb
 TikTok
 WeWork
 Alibaba
 Google	
 Spotify	
 Netflix		
 Adidas		
 YOOX	
 WeTransfer

References

Mass media companies established in 2009
Companies based in the London Borough of Islington
2009 establishments in England